Nicholas John Peter Wirth (born 26 March 1966) is an automotive engineer and the founder and owner of Wirth Research.

He is also the former owner of the Simtek Formula One team, a former aerodynamicist at March and former technical director at the Benetton, and Virgin Racing teams.

Education and early life
Wirth attended Sevenoaks School from 1977 to 1984 and has B.Sc(Hons) in Mechanical Engineering (First Class) from University College London and is the youngest-ever Fellow of the Royal Institution of Mechanical Engineers.

March
In addition, he conceived and designed all components of the March active suspension system, which ran successfully in February 1989.

Simtek
Simtek Research was founded in 1989 by Max Mosley and Nick Wirth. It originally was involved in many areas of Formula One, including wind tunnel construction and chassis building for third parties.  Wirth was previously employed by March Team owner Mosley.

From October 1993 to June 1995, Wirth was founder, owner, and technical director of Simtek Grand Prix, a Formula One racing team that first appeared in the 1994 Formula One season. Simtek Research provided the team with engineering and design for the cars.

The team suffered the blow of the death of Roland Ratzenberger during qualifying for the San Marino Grand Prix. Simtek suffered a difficult first season and eventually pulled out of Formula One during the  season which forced Simtek Research into bankruptcy.

Benetton and projects outside Formula One
From 1996 until 1999 Wirth was chief designer and later a board member of the Benetton Formula One team.

In 1999 Wirth founded RoboScience, and created the RS-01 RoboDog in 2001.

In 2003 he founded Wirth Research.

In 2006 Wirth Research began working for the FIA in the Casumaro windtunnel in Italy on the split rear wing (CDG) design that the FIA proposed for the 2008 F1 season.

In 2007 Wirth Research became involved with the Acura LMP programme in the American Le Mans Series and was involved with designing the LMP1 class car for 2009 season. Wirth used computational fluid dynamics extensively to design the LMP1 class car.

Virgin Racing
In 2009 Wirth Design teamed up with John Booth of Manor Motorsport to create a car for the 2010 Formula One season. Wirth was appointed the technical director of the team.  Richard Branson's company Virgin became a title sponsor and the team was renamed Virgin Racing.  The car that Wirth designed for use in the 2010 season, the Virgin VR-01, is the first Formula One racing car designed entirely with computational fluid dynamics with no use of traditional wind tunnels during the design or build process.

Wirth also designed Virgin's second F1 car, the MVR-02, but its performance proved to be disappointing as it failed to close the gap to the leaders relative to the VR-01. In June 2011, Virgin announced that it had parted company with Wirth and abandoned its policy of only using CFD.

References

External links
Profile at grandprix.com
Profile on the Virgin Racing website

1966 births
Living people
Formula One team owners
Formula One team principals
English engineers
British mechanical engineers
Formula One designers
English motorsport people
People educated at Sevenoaks School
Benetton Formula